Michael Donkor (born 1985) is a British author and English teacher based in London. He is represented by Blake Friedmann and Fourth Estate.

Early life and education 
Donkor was born in London to a Ghanaian household. He completed his bachelor's degree in English at Wadham College, Oxford, as well as a master's in Creative Writing at University of London. At the University of Oxford he was one of only 21 black students in his year. At the University of London he was supervised by Andrew Motion.

Career 
In 2010 Donkor trained as an English teacher at the UCL Institute of Education, and began his teaching career at Esher College. He formally taught at St Paul's Girls' School. He has left his job there (as of 2022) and is pursuing a career of writing in Portugal, Lisbon. In 2014 he was chosen by the National Centre for Writing for their mentoring programme, through which he met mentor Daniel Hahn and agent Juliet Pickering. He was described by HarperCollins as a "powerful new British literary voice". The Observer selected him as a New Face of Fiction in January 2018. He is inspired by Zadie Smith, Chimamanda Ngozi Adichie and Toni Morrison.

Hold 
Fourth Estate gained publishing rights to Donkor's Hold, which was published in July 2018. It follows the stories of three teenage girls from Kumasi, Ghana, to Brixton, London, in 2002, and has been described as a coming-of-age novel. Donkor chose to set Hold in 2002 as it marks the summer he was applying to study English at university. Hold was longlisted for the 2019 Dylan Thomas Prize.

References

External links 

 

1985 births
Living people
British writers
Schoolteachers from London
Alumni of Wadham College, Oxford
Alumni of the University of London
English people of Ghanaian descent
Black British writers
21st-century British male writers